John Donnelly (c. 1822 – 3 June 1904) was a New Zealand whaler and gold prospector. He was born in London, England.

References

1822 births
1904 deaths
New Zealand gold prospectors
New Zealand people in whaling
English emigrants to New Zealand